Country Homes & Interiors is published by Future plc and is the only magazine in the UK dedicated to modern country style.

History and profile
The magazine launched in April 1986 in London, England. Each issue features country houses from around the UK plus accompanying photographs and owner profiles; country style decorating; interior design ideas; gardens and planting advice; and seasonal food and entertaining. Other articles include 'Earning a living' which profiles small country-based businesses and 'My favourite view' page with photographs of nominated landscapes from around the UK.

References

External links
 

Lifestyle magazines published in the United Kingdom
Monthly magazines published in the United Kingdom
Women's magazines published in the United Kingdom
Magazines published in London
Magazines established in 1986